Charles, Knight Vandenhove (3 July 1927, Teuven – 22 January 2019, Liège) was one of the leading Belgian architects of the 20th century. His company Charles Vandenhove et associés is based in Liège, Belgium. He is mostly known for his work in Belgium, the Netherlands and Paris ranging from the 1950s to the 2010s.

Biography 
Vandenhove graduated in 1945 from the Liège university of applied sciences Saint-Luc and in 1951 from the university of applied sciences for architecture La Cambre in Brussels. Vandenhove became famous with his design for the university campus Sart-Tilman (Liège Science Park) of the University of Liège in the 1970s. He demonstrated with his project Cour Saint-Antoine in the inner city of Liège that modern functional concepts can be merged with a respect for the historical fabric of the old city. Since the 1990s, Vandenhove was mostly active in the Netherlands. Many of the homes designed by Vandenhove can be recognized by typical halfround zinc roofs, French balconies and Louvre shutters.

In the 1980s and 1990s, Vandenhove collaborated with artists such as Sol LeWitt, Daniel Buren and Giulio Paolini in designing buildings such as the academic hospital of Liège, the Koninklijke Schouwburg in The Hague and the La Monnaie in Brussels. He also involved artists in the renovation and decoration of his own home, the 16th century city palace Hôtel Torrentius in Liège.

Charles and his wife Jeanne Vandenhove loaned their art collection of post-1945 European art in 2007 for long term to the Bonnefantenmuseum in Maastricht. The collection is currently maintained by the Stichting Charles Vandenhove (English: Charles Vandenhove Foundation) and is since 2012 permanently on display in a new home in Ghent, nearby the Henri Van de Veldes Boekentoren.

Recognition 
On 19 March 2016; Vandenhove was appointed as doctor honoris causa at the
University of Liège.

Projects 

 Academic Hospital C.H.U., Liège, Sart-Tilman, 1962-1987
 Sporthal Standard, Liège, 1968
 Universiteitssporthal Liège, Sart-Tilman, 1972
 Renovation and new constructions Hors-Château and Cour Saint-Antoine, Liège, 1978–85
 Renovation Hôtel Torrentius, Liège, 1981
 Renovation La Monnaie, Brussels, 1986
 Homes at Zieken, Huygenspark The Hague, 1987, 1992
 Renovation and extension Koninklijke Schouwburg, The Hague, 1991, 1999
 Apartment building de Liefde, Bilderdijkstraat, Amsterdam, 1992
 Homes at the Charles Voscour, Maastricht, 1993
 Apartment buildings Bassecour, Wageningen, 1993-1997
 Renovation Théâtre de la ville - rue des Abbesses, Paris, 1996
 Homes at the Kanunnikkencour, Maastricht, 1996
 Palace of Justice, 's-Hertogenbosch, 1998
 Homes at Poort van Breda, Breda, 1999
 Apartment building De Croissant and homes at the Bocht van Guinea, The Hague, 1999
 Faculty building, University of Groningen, 2001
 Apartment building Statenplein, Dordrecht, 2003
 Homes at Getsewoud, Nieuw-Vennep, 2002
 Antenne Sociale, OCMW, Brussels (Laeken), 2003
 City hall of Ridderkerk, 2004
 Catharinahuis Eindhoven, 2004
 Apartment building De Kölleminder, Venlo, 2006
 Apartment building Maison Céramique, Maastricht-Céramique, 2009

Gallery

Literature 

 Charles Vandenhove: Art in Architecture. Ludion, Ghent 2005, 
 Bart Verschaffel: Charles Vandenhove: Projects/Projecten 1995-2000. NAi Publ., Rotterdam 2000, 
 Geert Bekaert and others: Charles Vandenhove : art and architecture. Renaissance du Livre, Tournai 1998, 
 Geert Bekaert: Charles Vandenhove, 1985-1995. NAI Uitg., Rotterdam 1994,  
 Pierre Mardaga: Charles Vandenhove: Une architecture de la densité. Liège 1985,

References

External links 
 Website Charles Vandenhove

1927 births
2019 deaths
Belgian architects
Belgian art collectors